Sales tax tokens are fractional cent devices that were used to pay sales tax on very small purchases in many American states during the years of the Great Depression. They were created as a means for consumers to avoid being "overcharged" by having to pay a full penny tax on purchases of 5 or 10 cents. Issued by private firms, by municipalities, and by twelve state governments, sales tax tokens were generally issued in multiples of 1 mill ( cent).

History

Background

Prior to the coming of World War I in the summer of 1914, only two countries, Mexico and the Philippines, made use of a general sales tax for national finance. Excise tax — a transaction tax on the sale of specific items — was broadly used, however, and the idea of a general sales tax was neither unknown nor obscure to political decision-makers in the United States.

Indeed, in 1921 there was a concerted effort to implement a 1% national sales tax in the USA by attaching it to the 1921 national revenue bill and 1922 legislation providing for a soldiers' bonus. Although the proposals for a national sales tax were defeated by an alliance of farmer and labor interests, the state of West Virginia implemented a 1% sales tax of its own in that same year, using the revenue so generated as a replacement for a corporate income tax. Improving economic conditions throughout that decade of the 1920s would leave West Virginia's use of a sales tax unique among the 48 American states.

In October 1929 the global economic crisis struck the United States. As unemployment skyrocketed, income tax revenue plummeted and defaults on property taxes spiked.  Meanwhile, calls for state spending on relief measures for the indigent and the unemployed expanded beyond the states' capabilities.<ref name=MaD10>Malehorn and Davenport, 'United States Sales Tax Tokens and Stamps, pg. 10.</ref> Georgia's early adoption of a sales tax in 1929 was followed by a wave of sales tax adoptions, spurred on by the deep financial crisis. In 1933, 11 more states, including New York, Illinois, California, and Michigan, adopted sales taxes.

Launch of sales tax tokens

The twelve states that issued these sales tax tokens were Alabama, Arizona, Colorado, Illinois, Kansas, Louisiana, Mississippi, Missouri, New Mexico, Oklahoma, Utah, and Washington.

In addition to the fractional cent tokens used elsewhere, a closely related system of state-issued paper sales tax stamps and punch cards was used in the state of Ohio.

Sales tax tokens were generally regarded as a nuisance by consumers and were replaced in fairly short order by the bracket system of sales tax collection, which averaged out the tax on small sales. By the end of the 1930s token use was eliminated in most of the issuing states, with sales tax tokens lingering in Missouri until late in the 1940s.

Collectibility

Tax tokens were issued in a variety of materials, including cardboard, brass, bronze, aluminum, pressed cotton fiber, and plastic. The number of types issued is counted in the hundreds, with mintages of some of these types ranging upwards into the tens of millions. Consequently, tax tokens are regarded by numismatists as ubiquitous and often are of comparatively little value. On the other hand, certain types and varieties are extremely rare, with as few as one specimen known.

In 1971 collectors of sales tax tokens founded an organization called the American Tax Token Society, which has published a quarterly newsletter continuously since its foundation.

Catalogs

In addition to a number of early check-lists of available tokens, there have been two comprehensive catalogs published for collectors of sales tax tokens. The first of these, Chits, Chiselers, and Funny Money, by Michael G. Pfefferkorn and Jerry F. Schimmel, was published in 1977 with a press run of just 500 copies. A small number of bootleg copies were later photocopied and spiral-ring bound.

The Pfefferkorn and Schimmel catalog was superseded in 1993 with the publication of United States Tax Tokens and Stamps: A History and Catalog, by Merlin K. Malehorn and Tim Davenport. The books is colloquially known among collectors as “the M&D" based upon the surnames of the authors and the so-called "M&D" numbering system of that book remains in common use by tax token specialist collectors. Additional types and varieties discovered after publication of this latter book, complete with "pseudo-M&D" numbers, have been described and illustrated in various issues of ATTS Newsletter.Historical coverage in this latter book was supplemented in 2013 with the publication of Monte Dean's Sales Tax Tokens and Scrip: Histories, a massive one million word tome reproducing nearly 3,600 newspaper articles and monograph excerpts.

Footnotes

Further reading

 American Tax Token Society, ATTS Newsletter. (1971-date).
 Monte C. Dean, "A Brief History of Sales Tax Token and Scrip Collecting," Spring Valley, MN: Monte Dean, 2014.
 Monte C. Dean, Ohio Sales Tax Revenues; Stamps, Punch Cards, Tokens and Related Memorabilia. Spring Valley, MN: Monte Dean, 2012.
 Monte C. Dean, Sales Tax Tokens and Scrip: Histories. Spring Valley, MN: Monte Dean, 2013.
 Emil DiBella, Check-List of Sales Tax Tokens. New York: Emil DiBella, 1944.
 Chester M. Edelmann, "Bracket Systems and Sales Under One Dollar," Proceedings of the Annual Conference on Taxation under the Auspices of the National Tax Association, vol. 43 (1950), pp. 307–314. In JSTOR
 Merlin Malehorn and Tim Davenport, United States Sales Tax Tokens and Stamps: A History and Catalog. Bryantown, MD: Jade House Publications, 1993. 
 Michael Pfefferkorn and Jerry F. Schimmel, Chits, Chiselers, and Funny Money: A History and Catalogue of United States Sales Tax Tokens, Receipts, and Punchcards. Amherst, NY: Scorpion Publishers, 1977.
 Jerry F. Schimmel, U.S. State Issued Sales Tax Tokens. Azusa, CA: American Tax Token Society, 1973.  
 Jerry F. Schimmel, Sales Tax Tokens: Prices. San Francisco, CA: Jerry F. Schimmel, n.d.
 David Stolaroff, Sales Tax Tokens: A Study in Fractional Revenue.'' Master's thesis. American University, 1953.

External links

 American Tax Token Society official homepage (No longer a valid link)
 Robert Frye, "What are Sales Tax Tokens: Introduction and History," www.taxtoken.org/
 TAMS: Token and Medal Society homepage, www.tokenandmedal.org/

Numismatics
Token coins
Sales taxes
Great Depression
1930s economic history